Mokati Stadium is a stadium in Otjiwarongo, Namibia. It is the home stadium of Mighty Gunners and Life Fighters, who play in the Namibia Premier League.

Mokati is situated in the suburb of Orwetoveni.

References

Otjiwarongo
Sports venues in Namibia
Football venues in Namibia
Buildings and structures in Otjozondjupa Region